Biauswah (Bayaaswaa in Ojibwe, meaning "The Dry-one") was the name of two different Ojibwa chiefs.

 Biauswah (I) (late 17th century), an Ojibwa chief from Wisconsin
 Biauswah (II), an Ojibwa chief from Minnesota